O'Kennedy Park (sometimes designated Kennedy Park) is a GAA stadium in New Ross, County Wexford, Ireland.  It is the main ground of Geraldine O'Hanrahan's Gaelic football and hurling teams and has also hosted inter-county fixtures.  It was named O'Kennedy Park in 1953 after Seán O'Kennedy and Gus O'Kennedy in recognition of their contributions to Wexford GAA.

Its former name was Barrett's Park.

See also
 List of Gaelic Athletic Association stadiums

References

Gaelic games grounds in the Republic of Ireland
Sport in New Ross
Sports venues in County Wexford
Wexford GAA